Gérard Robert Daniel Faucomprez (9 October 1944 – 2 April 2005) was a French ice hockey player. He competed in the men's tournament at the 1968 Winter Olympics.

References

External links
 

1944 births
2005 deaths
Ice hockey players at the 1968 Winter Olympics
Olympic ice hockey players of France
People from Brive-la-Gaillarde
Sportspeople from Corrèze